Shuanglian (formerly transliterated as Shuanglien Station until 2003) is a metro station in Taipei, Taiwan served by Taipei Metro.

Station overview

The station is located underneath the metro park, near Minsheng West Road and Zhongshan North Road. The station is a two-level, underground structure with one island platform and two exits. The washrooms are inside the entrance area.

Public art in the station consists of a mural titled "Dawning Sail". Composed of porcelain enamel, the mural reflects Shuanglian's rich historical past from its role as a once-prosperous trading post on the Tamsui River to new developments in the area.

The station is a planned transfer station with the Minsheng-Xizhi Line.

History

TRA Station
1943: The station re-opened after renovation.
In the past, there was a goods loading center near the station. Thus, it became a major transfer center on the Tamsui Line.
15 July 1988: Closed along with the TRA Tamsui Line.

Taipei Metro Station
July 1993: DORTS decided to use the station as one of the trial stations for public art installations.
28 March 1997: Opened for service with the opening of the segment from Tamsui to Zhongshan.

Station layout

Exits
Exit 1: Minsheng W. Rd.
Exit 2: Minsheng W. Rd.

Other metro services
The station is an entrance to the Zhongshan Underground Metro Mall, connecting (between this station and Zhongshan station).

Around the station
 Chen Dexing Ancestral Hall
 Immaculate Conception Cathedral
 Ministry of Labor
 Taiyuan Asian Puppet Theatre Museum
 Mackay Commemorative Hospital
 Taipei Rapid Transit Corporation Headquarters
 Tatong District Main Office
 Taipei Imperial Hotel
 Minxiang Park
 Taipei City Archives

References

Tamsui–Xinyi line stations
Railway stations opened in 1916
Railway stations opened in 1943
Railway stations closed in 1988
Railway stations opened in 1997
Railway stations with vitreous enamel panels